These are the results of the women's singles competition in badminton at the 2008 Summer Olympics in Beijing.

The tournament consisted of a single-elimination tournament. Matches were played using a best-of-three games format. Games were played to 21 points, using rally scoring. Each game had to be won by a margin of two points, except when the game was won by a player who reached 30 even if the lead was only 1 at that point.

The top eight seeds in the tournament were placed in the bracket so as not to face each other until the quarterfinals. All other competitors were placed by draw.

Seeds
A Total of 8 Players were given seeds.

   (silver medallist)
   (gold medallist)
   (fourth place)
   (third round)
  (quarter-finals)
  (third round)
  (quarter-finals)
  (quarter-finals)

Draw

Finals

Section 1

Section 2

Section 3

Section 4

Badminton at the 2008 Summer Olympics
Olymp
Women's events at the 2008 Summer Olympics